The Village of Indian Hill is a city in Hamilton County, Ohio, United States, and an affluent suburb of the Greater Cincinnati area. The population was 6,087 at the 2020 census. Prior to 1970, Indian Hill was incorporated as a village, but under Ohio law became designated as a city once its population was verified as exceeding 5,000. The municipality then changed its name to add "Village" into the official name; legally it is "The City of The Village of Indian Hill". The Village of Indian Hill is served by the Indian Hill Exempted Village School District (public school district). It has previously been named as the "Best Place to Raise a Family" by the magazine Robb Report.

Geography

Its physical characteristics run the gamut from flat, open, grassy fields to heavily wooded, steeply sloped, mature canopy forest. There are meandering streams, dark pine stands, and intriguing geological formations with a plethora of fossils.

History
The Village of Indian Hill began as a farming community which prospered as the nearby Little Miami Railroad provided cost effective shipping to Cincinnati. From about 1904, Cincinnatians bought up its farmhouses as rural weekend destinations. They reached Indian Hill on the Swing Line, a train running between downtown Cincinnati and Ramona Station; the site is now the location of Indian Hill's administration building at Drake and Shawnee Run roads.

The rolling country appealed to a group of four Cincinnati businessmen who had built homes there in the early 1920s and envisioned a more ambitious rural settlement, persuading friends to join them in forming the Camargo Realty Company in 1924. Camargo assembled  of farmland and divided some into  plots, sold for $75 to $150 per acre, and a district of grand mansions with stables and outbuildings grew up, with kennels that housed the Camargo Hunt.

One hundred percent of Indian Hill is zoned as single-family residential or agricultural.

Demographics

2010 census
At the 2010 census there were 5,785 people in 2,061 households, including 1,768 families, in the city. The racial makeup of the city was 92.2% White, 0.7% African American, 0.1% Native American, 5.7% Asian, 0.2% from other races, and 1.1% from two or more races. Hispanic or Latino of any race were 1.6%.

Of the 2,061 households, 37.0% had children under the age of 18 living with them, 80.2% were married couples living together, 4.0% had a female householder with no husband present, 1.6% had a male householder with no wife present, and 14.2% were non-families. 12.4% of households were one person, and 7% were one person aged 65 or older. The average household size was 2.81 and the average family size was 3.06.

The median age was 48.4 years. 27% of residents were under the age of 18; 4.9% were between the ages of 18 and 24; 12.1% were from 25 to 44; 38.5% were from 45 to 64; and 17.5% were 65 or older. The gender makeup of the city was 48.4% male and 51.6% female.

2000 census
At the 2000 census there were 5,907 people in 2,066 households, including 1,751 families, in the city. The population density was 318.7 people per square mile (123.1/km). There were 2,155 housing units at an average density of 116.3 per square mile (44.9/km). The racial makeup of the city was 94.41% White, 0.54% African American, 0.08% Native American, 3.88% Asian, 0.15% from other races, and 0.93% from two or more races. Hispanic or Latino of any race were 0.59%.

Of the 2,066 households, 40.9% had children under the age of 18 living with them, 80.3% were married couples living together, 2.8% had a female householder with no husband present, and 15.2% were non-families. 14.4% of households were one person, and 8.5% were one person aged 65 or older. The average household size was 2.86 and the average family size was 3.16.

In the city, the population was spread out, with 30.3% under the age of 18, 4.3% from 18 to 24, 16.1% from 25 to 44, 34.6% from 45 to 64, and 14.8% 65 or older. The median age was 45 years. For every 100 females, there were 96.8 males. For every 100 females age 18 and over, there were 95.9 males.

The median household income was $158,742 and the median family income was $179,356. Males had a median income of $100,000 versus $66,875 for females. The per capita income for the city was $96,872. About 1.6% of families and 2.4% of the population were below the poverty line, including 4.5% of those under age 18 and none of those age 65 or over.

Education
The educational needs of Indian Hill residents are served by the Indian Hill Exempted Village School District (public) and Cincinnati Country Day School (private). The Indian Hill Exempted Village School District comprises Indian Hill Primary School (K-2), Indian Hill Elementary School (3–5), Indian Hill Middle School (6–8), and Indian Hill High School (9–12). Indian Hill High School is known nationally for excellence in education, and has recently been ranked 48th in the nation in U.S. News & World Report and was named a 2007 No Child Left Behind Blue Ribbon School. The Indian Hill Exempted Village School District also serves residents residing in parts of Symmes Township (Camp Dennison, Remington, Loveland) and Sycamore Township (Kenwood). Cincinnati Country Day School is also a nationally distinguished K-12 school and has been the filming location of many motion pictures (e.g. Little Man Tate and The Public Eye). It serves residents across the Greater Cincinnati area, as well as Indian Hill residents.

Notable people
 Neil Armstrong, American astronaut and first person to walk on the Moon
 William DeWitt Jr., Managing Partner and Chairman of the St. Louis Cardinals
 Peter Frampton, English-American rock musician, singer, songwriter, producer, guitarist and multi-instrumentalist
 Paul Hackett, attorney, congressional candidate
 Mat Latos, pitcher for Miami Marlins
 Marvin Lewis, former head coach of the Cincinnati Bengals
 Carl Lindner Jr., businessman
 Carson Palmer, American football quarterback
 Mercer Reynolds, businessman
 Marge Schott, president and CEO of the Cincinnati Reds
 Rick Steiner, Broadway producer
 Robert A. Taft, conservative American politician, statesman, and presidential hopeful
 Victory Van Tuyl, professional actress
 J. J. Wolf, tennis player
 Victoria Wells Wulsin, congressional candidate

See also
 Stanley M. Rowe Arboretum

References

External links
 City website
 Indian Hill School District
Indian Hill Historical Society

 
Cities in Ohio
Cities in Hamilton County, Ohio
Populated places established in 1924